Utetheisa varians is a moth in the family Erebidae. It was described by Francis Walker in 1854. It is found in China (Guangxi, Yunnan, Hainan), eastern and northern India, Bangladesh, Bhutan, Myanmar and Indochina.

References

Moths described in 1854
varians